RoboGames (previously ROBOlympics) is an annual robot contest held in San Mateo, California. The last RoboGames was held April 27–29, 2018. On July 22, 2022, RoboGames 2023 was announced for April 6–9, once again in Pleasanton, California.

Competitions typically involve entrants representing a large selection of countries, who compete in over fifty categories, such as autonomously navigating robots in RoboMagellan, combat robots, stair-climbing, weight-lifting, soccer bots, sumo bots, and kung-fu. About two thirds of the robot events are autonomous, while the remaining third are remotely operated (RCVs). Despite this, a large plurality of entrants in RoboGames remain in the remotely operated events, specifically combat robotics.

According to the Guinness Book of World Records, the 2005 RoboGames held the record for the world's largest robot competition until being surpassed by VEX Worlds in 2016. RoboGames was selected by Wired for their list of "The Best Ten North American Geek Fests".

Media coverage
In May/June 2011, Science Channel broadcast selected heavyweight combat division matches from RoboGames in a one-hour special titled Killer Robots: RoboGames 2011. The program was hosted by Grant Imahara.
RoboGames built a framework for collaboration between builders and engineers from all over the world.

Events
RoboGames events are divided into ten general categories:
 Humanoids, for human-like robots
 Sumo, where the robots push their opponents
 Combat, where the object is to destroy one's opponent's robot
 Junior League, a category for under-18s
 Autonomous Autos, a navigation category
 BEAM, a racing competition
 Art Bots, for aesthetically pleasing robots
 Robot Soccer, a soccer competition
 Autonomous Humanoid Challenges
 Open, a miscellaneous category

References

External links
 

2004 in robotics
Recurring events established in 2004
Robot combat competitions
Robot soccer competitions
Robotics competitions